Valerie Hansen is an American historian.

Career
After graduating from Kent School in 1975, Harvard University in 1979 and receiving her doctorate from the University of Pennsylvania in 1987, she joined Yale University in 1988 as assistant professor and became a professor in 1998. Hansen spent one year in Shanghai on a Fulbright grant from 2005–06; 2008–09 and 2011–12, teaching at Yale's joint undergraduate program with Peking University; and fall semester 2015 teaching at Yale-NUS college in Singapore. 

Valerie Hansen became the Stanley Woodward Professor of History in 2017. At Yale, she teaches History of Traditional China, The History of World History, and seminars on Silk Road history.

Works
Hansen's first book was Changing Gods in Medieval China, 1127-1279, which was published in 1990. Her second book, Negotiating Daily Life in Traditional China, 600-1400, appeared in 1995. 

In 2000, she published, The Open Empire. A second edition of the book was published in 2015. The book argues, contrary to the widespread view that no outsiders ever influenced traditional China, that Indian Buddhists and northern nomadic peoples shaped traditional China throughout its long history.

In 2012, Hansen published The Silk Road: A New History, which argued that the Silk Road trade was small-scale and usually involved local goods. The book received rave reviews from critics.

In April 2020, The Year 1000: When Explorers Connected the World—and Globalization Began was published to mostly favorable reviews.

Bibliography
Changing Gods in Medieval China, 1127-1279 (1990) 
Negotiating Daily Life in Traditional China (1995) 
The Silk Road: A New History (2012) 
The Open Empire: A History of China to 1600 (2000) 
Voyages in World History (co-authored with Kenneth R. Curtis) 
 First Edition (2005)
Second Edition (2008)
Third Edition (2015)
 The Year 1000: When Explorers Connected the World—and Globalization Began (2020) ISBN 978-1-5011-9410-8

Awards and honors
2013 - Gustav Ranis International Book Prize, co-winner, for the best book on an international subject by a member of the Yale University faculty
2013 - International Convention of Asia Scholars Book Prize Reading Committee Accolade for the best teaching tool in the Humanities
2021 - Elected into the American Academy of Arts and Sciences

References

Year of birth missing (living people)
Living people
21st-century American historians
Harvard University alumni
Kent School alumni
University of Pennsylvania alumni
Yale University faculty
21st-century American women writers
American women historians
Writers about globalization